Chiavi in Mano is a piano concerto in one movement by the composer Yehudi Wyner.  The work was commissioned by the Boston Symphony Orchestra and was first performed in February 2005 by the pianist Robert D. Levin and the Boston Symphony Orchestra under the conductor Robert Spano.  The piece was later awarded Pulitzer Prize for Music in 2006.

Composition
Chiavi in Mano has a duration of roughly 20 minutes and is composed in a single continuous movement.  Wyner described the composition of the piece in the score program notes, writing:

Instrumentation
The work is scored for an orchestra comprising two flutes, piccolo, two oboes, two clarinets, two bassoons, four horns, two trumpets, three trombones, tuba, timpani, percussion, and strings.

References

Compositions by Yehudi Wyner
2004 compositions
Piano concertos
Pulitzer Prize for Music-winning works
Music commissioned by the Boston Symphony Orchestra